The brook Saint-Camille (in French: ruisseau Saint-Camille) is a tributary of the east bank of the Nicolet Southwest River whose current flows successively into the Nicolet River, the lac Saint-Pierre and the St. Lawrence River. Its course flows through the municipalities of Saint-Camille and Saint-Georges-de-Windsor, in the Les Sources Regional County Municipality (MRC), in the administrative region of Estrie, in Quebec, in Canada.

Geography 

The main hydrographic slopes near the Saint-Camille stream are:
 north side: Dion River;
 east side: Nicolet Centre River;
 south side Nicolet Southwest River;
 west side: Nicolet Southwest River.

The Saint-Camille stream feeds on various agricultural and forest streams in an area north-east of the village of Saint-Camille. This head zone is located southeast of rue Miquelon (route 216) and on the northeast side of rue Desrivières.

  westward, in the municipality of Saint-Camille, to rue Miquelon (route 216);
  west, to rue Desrivières;
  westward, up to the municipal limit of Wotton;
  westward, in the municipality of Wotton, to the municipal limit of Saint-Georges-de-Windsor;
  westward, in Saint-Georges-de-Windsor, to its mouth.

The Saint-Camille stream empties on the east bank of the Nicolet Southwest River.

Toponymy 
The term "Camille" constitutes a first name of French origin.

The toponym "Ruisseau Saint-Camille" was made official on December 5, 1968, at the Commission de toponymie du Québec.

See also 

 List of rivers of Quebec

References 

Rivers of Estrie